Petri Järvinen (born 9 May 1965) is a Finnish football manager and former player who coaches FC Lahti Akatemia in the Finnish third tier Kakkonen.

On his professional career Järvinen played for several Finnish clubs and for FC St. Pauli and Waldhof Mannheim in the 2. Bundesliga. He was capped 36 times for the Finland national team, scoring four goals.

Honours 
Finnish Championship: 1989, 1991

References 

Veikkausliiga player statistics

Living people
1965 births
Finnish footballers
Association football midfielders
Finland international footballers
2. Bundesliga players
Finnish football managers
Finnish expatriate footballers
Finnish expatriate sportspeople in Germany
Expatriate footballers in Germany
Footballers from Helsinki
JJK Jyväskylä players
FC Ilves players
FC Jazz players
FC Haka players
FC Kuusysi players
FC St. Pauli players
FinnPa players
SV Waldhof Mannheim players
FC Lahti players
FC Honka players